Brunei made its Paralympic Games debut at the 2012 Summer Paralympics in London, United Kingdom, from August 29 to September 9.

Brunei was represented by a single athlete, Shari Hj Juma'at, who qualified to compete in the men's javelin throw, F54-56 (wheelchair athletes). He was, in 2012, the world's highest ranking javelin thrower in his disability category, and had achieved a throw of 29.83m earlier in the year, giving the country hopes for obtaining its first Olympic or Paralympic medal.

Athletics 

Men’s Field Events

See also
Summer Paralympic disability classification
Brunei at the Paralympics
Brunei at the 2012 Summer Olympics

Notes

Nations at the 2012 Summer Paralympics
2012
Paralympics